The 2021–22 NBL season was the 19th season for the New Zealand Breakers in the NBL.

Roster

Pre-season

Ladder

Game log 

|-style="background:#fcc;"
| 1
| 13 November
| @ Melbourne
| L 90–84
| Finn Delany (20)
| Sam Timmins (7)
| Peyton Siva (3)
| Melbourne Sports and Aquatic Centreclosed event
| 0–1
|-style="background:#cfc;"
| 2
| 18 November
| Sydney
| W 97–93
| Jeremiah Martin (23)
| Peyton Siva (6)
| Martin, Siva (7)
| Melbourne Sports and Aquatic Centreclosed event
| 1–1
|-style="background:#cfc;"
| 3
| 20 November
| S.E. Melbourne
| W 92–90
| Hugo Besson (24)
| Yanni Wetzell (12)
| McDowell-White, Siva (4)
| Melbourne Sports and Aquatic Centreclosed event
| 2–1

|-style="background:#ccc;"
| 1
| 25 November
| @ Illawarra
| colspan="6" | Cancelled

Regular season

Ladder

Game log 

|-style="background:#fcc;"
| 1
| 4 December
| @ S.E. Melbourne
| L 89–65
| Finn Delany (18)
| Finn Delany (9)
| Jeremiah Martin (4)
| John Cain Arena3,453
| 0–1
|-style="background:#fcc;"
| 2
| 10 December
| @ S.E. Melbourne
| L 95–88
| Finn Delany (26)
| Hugo Besson (8)
| William McDowell-White (8)
| John Cain Arena3,752
| 0–2
|-style="background:#fcc;"
| 3
| 12 December
| @ Adelaide
| L 98–85
| William McDowell-White (27)
| Robert Loe (6)
| William McDowell-White (7)
| Adelaide Entertainment Centre4,445
| 0–3
|-style="background:#fcc;"
| 4
| 17 December
| @ Illawarra
| L 97–96 (2OT)
| Yanni Wetzell (25)
| Yanni Wetzell (17)
| Delany, McDowell-White (4)
| WIN Entertainment Centre2,873
| 0–4
|-style="background:#fcc;"
| 5
| 19 December
| @ Melbourne
| L 83–60
| Finn Delany (14)
| Finn Delany (9)
| Delany, Martin (4)
| John Cain Arena5,479
| 0–5
|-style="background:#fcc;"
| 6
| 26 December
| @ Tasmania
| L 84–75
| Jeremiah Martin (24)
| Yanni Wetzell (10)
| Jeremiah Martin (8)
| MyState Bank Arena4,623
| 0–6

|-style="background:#cfc;"
| 7
| 9 January
| @ Brisbane
| W 83–88
| Yanni Wetzell (27)
| Yanni Wetzell (8)
| Jeremiah Martin (8)
| Nissan Arena2,925
| 1–6
|-style="background:#fcc;"
| 8
| 14 January
| Melbourne
| L 78–89
| Jeremiah Martin (20)
| Yanni Wetzell (9)
| Peyton Siva (5)
| MyState Bank Arenaclosed event
| 1–7
|-style="background:#cfc;"
| 9
| 16 January
| @ Sydney
| W 75–82
| Jeremiah Martin (22)
| Finn Delany (9)
| Peyton Siva (5)
| Qudos Bank Arena4,356
| 2–7
|-style="background:#fcc;"
| 10
| 30 January
| Tasmania
| L 59–83
| Hugo Besson (19)
| Hugo Besson (8)
| William McDowell-White (7)
| MyState Bank Arena1,477
| 2–8

|-style="background:#cfc;"
| 11
| 2 February
| Illawarra
| W 90–67
| Yanni Wetzell (22)
| Finn Delany (13)
| William McDowell-White, (6)
| MyState Bank Arenaclosed event
| 3–8
|-style="background:#fcc;"
| 12
| 6 February
| @ Sydney
| L 84–65
| Yanni Wetzell (16)
| Delany, Dieng, Wetzell (5)
| McDowell-White, Wetzell (3)
| Qudos Bank Arena5,011
| 3–9
|-style="background:#cfc;"
| 13
| 14 February
| @ Cairns
| W 83–84
| Yanni Wetzell (23)
| Yanni Wetzell (12)
| Hugo Besson (5)
| Cairns Convention Centre2,795
| 4–9
|-style="background:#fcc;"
| 14
| 20 February
| @ Melbourne
| L 108–73
| Besson, Siva (17)
| Besson, Delany (5)
| Peyton Siva (5)
| John Cain Arena6,033
| 4–10

|-style="background:#fcc;"
| 15
| 1 March
| Illawarra
| L 87–102
| Hugo Besson (20)
| Hugo Besson (7)
| Peyton Siva (8)
| MyState Bank Arenaclosed event
| 4–11
|-style="background:#fcc;"
| 16
| 5 March
| @ Tasmania
| L 66–62
| Chasson Randle (18)
| Ousmane Dieng (9)
| Peyton Siva (9)
| Silverdome3,532
| 4–12
|-style="background:#fcc;"
| 17
| 7 March
| Brisbane
| L 74–92
| Chasson Randle (20)
| Finn Delany (6)
| Peyton Siva (6)
| MyState Bank Arenaclosed event
| 4–13
|-style="background:#cfc;"
| 18
| 12 March
| Adelaide
| W 84–75
| Hugo Besson (17)
| Yanni Wetzell (9)
| Peyton Siva (6)
| Adelaide Arena3,044
| 5–13
|-style="background:#fcc;"
| 19
| 14 March
| Perth
| L 102–104 (OT)
| Hugo Besson (23)
| Yanni Wetzell (18)
| Peyton Siva (7)
| MyState Bank Arenaclosed event
| 5–14
|-style="background:#fcc;"
| 20
| 20 March
| @ Perth
| L 95–85
| Yanni Wetzell (15)
| Yanni Wetzell (6)
| Peyton Siva (9)
| RAC Arena6,927
| 5–15
|-style="background:#fcc;"
| 21
| 24 March
| Brisbane
| L 100–101 (OT)
| Yanni Wetzell (23)
| Yanni Wetzell (10)
| Peyton Siva (8)
| Cairns Convention Centreclosed event
| 5–16
|-style="background:#fcc;"
| 22
| 27 March
| Cairns
| L 90–93
| Yanni Wetzell (21)
| Yanni Wetzell (8)
| Hugo Besson (6)
| Cairns Convention Centreclosed event
| 5–17

|-style="background:#fcc;"
| 23
| 4 April
| Cairns
| L 77–87
| Yanni Wetzell (24)
| Yanni Wetzell (9)
| William McDowell-White (4)
| MyState Bank Arenaclosed event
| 5–18
|-style="background:#fcc;"
| 24
| 7 April
| @ Perth
| L 89–80
| Yanni Wetzell (22)
| Yanni Wetzell (10)
| Peyton Siva (6)
| RAC Arena10,270
| 5–19
|-style="background:#fcc;"
| 25
| 10 April
| S.E. Melbourne
| L 89–99
| Ousmane Dieng (22)
| Dieng, Wetzell (6)
| Finn Delany (7)
| Bendigo Stadiumnot available
| 5–20
|-style="background:#fcc;"
| 26
| 12 April
| Sydney
| L 70–76
| Yanni Wetzell (22)
| Yanni Wetzell (14)
| McDowell-White, Siva (6)
| Bendigo Stadium1,543
| 5–21
|-style="background:#fcc;"
| 27
| 15 April
| Tasmania
| L 86–88
| Robert Loe (27)
| Robert Loe (7)
| Hugo Besson (7)
| MyState Bank Arenaclosed event
| 5–22
|-style="background:#fcc;"
| 28
| 24 April
| Adelaide
| L 60–93
| Bach, Randle (14)
| Robert Loe (10)
| Peyton Siva (7)
| MyState Bank Arenaclosed event
| 5–23

Transactions

Re-signed

Additions

Subtractions

Awards

Club awards 
 Club MVP: Yanni Wetzell
 Member MVP: Yanni Wetzell
 Defensive Player: Peyton Siva
 Clubman Award: Tim Maifeleni
 Community Cup: Tony Pompallier

See also 
 2021–22 NBL season
 New Zealand Breakers

References

External links 

 Official Website

New Zealand Breakers
New Zealand Breakers seasons
New Zealand Breakers season